Outcast or Outcasts may refer to:
Outcast (person), a person with social stigma or untouchability

Literature
The Outcasts (play), 1884 play by Ivan Vazov
The Outcasts, 1901 novel by William Alexander Fraser
Outcast, 1914 play by Hubert Henry Davies
The Outcast, a 1929 illustrated pamphlet of poetry by James Stephens for Faber
Outcast (Sutcliff novel), 1955 children's novel by Rosemary Sutcliff
The Outcasts, a 1962 novel by Edith Sitwell
The Outcast, a 1987 young-adult novel by Patricia Bernard
Outcasts (DC Comics), 1987 comic book series by John Wagner and Cam Kennedy
Outcast (Ballas novel), 1991 book by Iraqi-Israeli author Shimon Ballas
The Outcast (novel), 1993 novel by Simon Hawke
Outcast (magazine), 1999-2001 queer magazine in the United Kingdom
The Outcasts, a 2004 novel by L. S. Matthews 
The Outcast, 2005 book of Guardians of Ga'Hoole series
The Outcast (anthology), 2006 short story collection published by the Canberra Speculative Fiction Guild
Outcast (Paver novel), a 2007 book by Michelle Paver
The Outcast, 2007 manga published by Seven Seas Entertainment
Outcast, 2008 novel in the Warriors: Power of Three series by Erin Hunter
The Outcast, 2008 novel by Sadie Jones
Outcast, 2009, first book in the Star Wars: Fate of the Jedi series, by Aaron Allston
The Outcasts (Brotherband), 2011, the first novel in the Brotherband series by John Flanagan
Outcast by Kirkman and Azaceta, 2014 comic book 
Outcaste (2017), sixth book in Fletcher DeLancey's Chronicles of Alsea series
 Outcasts, various comic book characters in Marvel Comics, see list of Marvel Comics teams and organizations

Music
Outkast, an American hip hop duo based in East Point, Georgia
The Outcasts (Belfast band), a punk band from Belfast formed in the 1970s
The Outcasts (Texas band), a 1960s American band from Texas
Outcast,  signed to Listenable Records, France
The Outcasts, a 1960s band from Manhasset, New York, whose recordings were reissued by Cicadelic (Collectables)
The Outcasts, a 1960s band that became Gary Puckett & The Union Gap
Outcast, duo of Richard Brown and Beaumont Hannant
The Outcast Band, English alternative rock band

Album 
Outcast (Kreator album), 1997
Outcast (Ektomorf album), 2006
Outcasts (Freak of Nature album), compilation
Outcasts (Palisades album), 2013

Songs 
"Outcast", a 1964 single by Eddie & Ernie, covered by The Animals on the album Animalisms
"Outcast", the fourth movement of Mike Oldfield's Tubular Bells III
"The Outcast", a song from Dropkick Murphys album Blackout
"Outcast", a song by Kerrie Roberts on the 2010 album Kerrie Roberts
"Outcast", an original song sung by the New Directions in Season 4 of Glee

Television
Outcasts (TV series), a BBC sci-fi series broadcast in 2011
Outcast (TV series), a 2016 Cinemax adaptation of the 2014 comic book written by Robert Kirkman
The Outcast (British TV series), a 2015 British two-part TV adaptation by Sadie Jones of her novel of the same name
The Outcasts (American TV series), a 1968–1969 American Western television series that aired on ABC
The Outcasts (Australian TV series), a 1961 Australian period-drama television serial
"The Outcast" (Star Trek: The Next Generation), TV series episode
"Outcast", TV series episode, see list of Hercules: The Legendary Journeys episodes
"Outcast", an episode from Season 4 of Stargate Atlantis

Film
Outcast (1917 film), an American silent film directed by Dell Henderson and starring Ann Murdock
Outcast (1922 film), a silent film starring Elsie Ferguson based on 1915 Broadway hit that starred Ferguson
Outcast (1928 film), a remake of the 1922 film with sound sequences; starring Corinne Griffith
The Outcast (1934 film), a British film directed by Norman Lee
Outcast (1937 film), a film directed by Robert Florey
The Outcast (1954 film), a Western film starring John Derek
The Outcasts (1982 film), an Irish film starring Mary Ryan
Outcasts, 1986 film based on the novel Crystal Boys
Outkast (2001 film), a film by Chico Ejiro
The Outcasts (2007 film), a 2007 Iranian film, written and directed by Masoud Dehnamaki
Outcast (2010 film), a film starring James Nesbitt
Outcast (2014 film), a film starring Nicolas Cage and Hayden Christensen
The Outcasts (2017 film), an American teen comedy film directed by Peter Hutchings

Places
Outcast Islands, two small islands near Antarctica
Outcast Islands (Nunavut), Canada

Other uses
Outcast, a British WW2 double agent involved earlier with the Zinoviev letter
Outcast (video game), a 1999 action-adventure computer game by Infogrames
The Outcast (Redgrave painting), an 1851 oil painting by Victorian artist Richard Redgrave
, a Russian nu metal band formed by former members of the band Amatory
 The Outcasts (professional wrestling), a wrestling stable